Mar Jacob Thoomkuzhy (born 13 December 1930) is an East Syriac Catholic Archbishop Emeritus, First Bishop of Mananthavady diocese, Second bishop of Thamarassery diocese and the second Metropolitan Archbishop of the Syro-Malabar Catholic Archdiocese of Thrissur in India. He was born at Vilakumadam in the Eparchy of Palai on 13 December 1930. He was educated at Thiruvambady in Kozhikode.

References

External links

1930 births
Living people
20th-century Eastern Catholic archbishops
Archbishops of Thrissur
Fordham University alumni
Pontifical Oriental Institute alumni
21st-century Eastern Catholic archbishops
People from Pala, Kerala